Emira may refer to:

Emira Island, an island in Papua New Guinea
Lotus Emira, a British sportscar

See also
Emir, title of high office in the Muslim world